Seven Pistols for a Gringo ( or Siete pistolas para un gringo) is a 1966 Spanish/Italian western film directed by Juan Xiol Marchal. It was written by Alberto Colucci, Ignacio Iquino and Roberto Bianchi Montero, and scored by Enrique Escobar. It stars Gerard Landry, Don Harrison, Fernando Rubio, Alberto Farnese, Alberto Gadea, Juan Manuel Simón, César Ojinaga and Gustavo Re.

Cast

References

External links
 

1966 films
Spanish Western (genre) films
Italian Western (genre) films
Spaghetti Western films
Films with screenplays by Roberto Bianchi Montero
Films with screenplays by Ignacio F. Iquino
1966 Western (genre) films
1960s Italian films